Vladan Vukosavljević may refer to:

 Vladan Vukosavljević (basketball) (born 1984), Serbian basketball player
 Vladan Vukosavljević (politician) (born 1962), Serbian politician